Frederick Keith Cornwell (born August 7, 1961) is a former professional American football tight end in the National Football League. He was selected by the Dallas Cowboys in the third round of the 1984 NFL Draft. He played college football at the University of Southern California.

Early years
Cornwell attended Canyon High School, where he practiced football, basketball and track (shot put).

He accepted a scholarship from the University of Southern California, where he contributed as a three-year starter with his blocking at the tight end position. As a senior, he registered 22 receptions for 236 yards and one touchdown.

He is mostly known for catching a touchdown pass from quarterback John Mazur with two seconds left, that gave his team a 28-24 victory over second ranked Oklahoma. Prior to this play, he only had one reception in his college career.

College Statistics
1981: 3 catches for 19 yards and 1 touchdown.
1982: 8 catches for 69 yards.
1983: 22 catches for 236 yards and 1 touchdown.

Professional career

Cornwell was selected by the Dallas Cowboys in the third round (81st overall) of the 1984 NFL Draft, with the team looking to improve the depth of the tight end position after the retirement of Billy Joe Dupree. He was also selected by the Los Angeles Express in the 1984 USFL Territorial Draft.

As a rookie, he missed 2 games with a back injury and was mainly used for blocking on short yardage situations. He didn't have much experience as a receiver and struggled executing the offense. He started against the Green Bay Packers as the second tight end.

In 1985, he appeared in 16 games. Against the Houston Oilers with the score tied at 10, he caught a one-yard touchdown pass with 1:51 minutes remaining to seal the win. He was released on August 25, 1986.

References

1961 births
Living people
People from Osborne, Kansas
Players of American football from California
Sportspeople from Santa Clarita, California
American football tight ends
USC Trojans football players
Dallas Cowboys players